Xylophanes ockendeni is a moth of the  family Sphingidae. It is known from Peru.

The length of the forewings is 35–36 mm. It is similar to Xylophanes rothschildi, but distinguishable by the slightly scalloped outer margin of the forewing, the more well-defined dark basal patch on the forewing upperside, the transversely oriented dark patch distal to the discal spot and the sinuate, brown postmedian band, distal of which, on the inner margin, is a black, triangular patch. The abdomen has a thin, brown dorsal line, either side of which is a row of small black spots, one on the posterior edge of each tergite. The underside of the abdomen has a lavender-red coloration. The forewing upperside is similar to Xylophanes macasensis but the ground colour is a deeper, darker, more bluish-green, on which the darker markings are less prominent, making the whole moth look more drab. The postmedian line is brownish, sinuate, less conspicuous and more poorly defined, distally blending in with the ground colour. The area around the discal spot is paler, rendering the spot more conspicuous. The submarginal line is represented by a series of small, dark vein spots.

The larvae probably feed on Rubiaceae and Malvaceae species.

Subspecies
Xylophanes ockendeni ockendeni (Peru)
Xylophanes ockendeni sensu Eitschberger, 2001

References

ockendeni
Moths described in 1904
Endemic fauna of Peru
Moths of South America